The siege of Belgrade, Battle of Belgrade or siege of Nándorfehérvár ( or ,  "Triumph of Nándorfehérvár") was a military blockade of Belgrade that occurred July 4–22, 1456. After the fall of Constantinople in 1453, the Ottoman Sultan Mehmed the Conqueror rallied his resources to subjugate the Kingdom of Hungary. His immediate objective was the border fort of the town of Belgrade. John Hunyadi, the Count of Temes and captain-general of Hungary, who had fought many battles against the Turks in the previous two decades, prepared the defenses of the fortress.

The siege escalated into a major battle, during which Hunyadi led a sudden counterattack that overran the Ottoman camp, ultimately compelling the wounded Mehmed II to lift the siege and retreat. The battle had significant consequences, as it stabilized the southern frontiers of the Kingdom of Hungary for more than half a century and thus considerably delayed the Ottoman advance in Europe.

As he had previously ordered all Catholic kingdoms to pray for the victory of the defenders of Belgrade, the Pope celebrated the victory by making an enactment to commemorate the day. This led to the legend that the noon bell ritual undertaken in Catholic and old Protestant churches, enacted by the Pope before the battle, was founded to commemorate the victory. The day of the victory, July 22, has been a memorial day in Hungary ever since.

Preparations
At the end of 1455, John Hunyadi began preparations for the defence of Belgrade. At his own expense, he provisioned and armed the fortress with a strong garrison under the command of his brother-in-law Mihály Szilágyi and his own eldest son László. Hunyadi then proceeded to form a relief army and an additional fleet of two hundred corvettes. The barons feared Hunyadi's growing power more than the Ottoman threat and left him entirely to his own devices.

An Italian Franciscan friar allied to Hunyadi, Giovanni da Capistrano, preached a crusade to attract peasants and local countryside landlords to Hunyadi's cause. The recruits were ill-armed, many with only slings and scythes, but they were highly motivated. The recruits came under Hunyadi's banner, the core of which consisted of smaller bands of seasoned mercenaries and a few groups of minor knights. All in all, Hunyadi managed to build a force of 25–30,000 men.

Siege

Before Hunyadi could assemble his forces, the army of Mehmed II (160,000 men in early accounts, 60–70,000 according to newer research) arrived at Belgrade. The siege began on July 4, 1456. Szilágyi could rely on a force of only 5,000–7,000 men in the castle. Mehmed set up his siege on the neck of the headland and started heavily bombarding the city's walls on June 29. He arrayed his men in three sections: The Rumelian corps had the majority of his 300 cannons, while his fleet of 200 river war vessels had the rest of them. The Rumelians were arrayed on the right wing and the Anatolian corps were arrayed on the left. In the middle were the personal guards of the Sultan, the Janissaries, and his command post. The Anatolian corps and the Janissaries were both heavy infantry troops. Mehmed posted his river vessels mainly to the northwest of the city to patrol the marshes and ensure that the fortress was not reinforced. They also kept an eye on the Sava river to the southwest to avoid the infantry from being outflanked by Hunyadi's army. The zone from the Danube eastwards was guarded by the Sipahi, the Sultan's feudal heavy cavalry corps, to avoid being outflanked on the right.

When Hunyadi was informed of this, he was in the south of Hungary recruiting additional light cavalry troops for the army, with which he would intend to lift the siege. Although relatively few, his fellow nobles were willing to provide manpower, and the peasants were more than willing to do so. Friar John of Capistrano had been sent to Hungary by the Vatican both to preach against heretics and to preach a crusade against the Ottomans. Capistrano managed to raise a large, albeit poorly trained and equipped, peasant army, with which he advanced towards Belgrade. Capistrano and Hunyadi traveled together though commanding the army separately. Both of them had gathered around 40,000–50,000 troops altogether.

The outnumbered defenders relied mainly on the strength of the formidable castle of Belgrade, which was at the time one of the best engineered in the Balkans. Belgrade had been designated as the capital of the Serbian Despotate by Stefan Lazarević 53 years prior.

The fortress was designed in an elaborate form with three lines of defense: the inner castle with the palace, a huge upper town with the main military camps, four gates and a double wall, as well as the lower town with the cathedral in the urban center and a port at the Danube. This building endeavor was one of the most elaborate military architecture achievements of the Middle Ages. After the siege, the Hungarians reinforced the north and eastern side with an additional gate and several towers, one of which, the Nebojša Tower, was designed for artillery purposes.

On July 14, 1456, Hunyadi arrived to the completely encircled city with his flotilla on the Danube, while the Ottoman navy lay astride the Danube River. He broke the naval blockade on July 14, sinking three large Ottoman galleys and capturing four large vessels and 20 smaller ones. By destroying the Sultan's fleet, Hunyadi was able to transport his troops and much-needed food into the city. The fort's defense was also reinforced.

But Mehmed II was not willing to end the siege and after a week of heavy bombardment, the walls of the fortress were breached in several places. On July 21 Mehmed ordered an all-out assault that began at sundown and continued all night. The besieging army flooded the city and then started its assault on the fort. As this was the most crucial moment of the siege, Hunyadi ordered the defenders to throw tarred wood and other flammable material, and then set it afire. Soon a wall of flames separated the Janissaries fighting in the city from their fellow soldiers trying to breach through the gaps into the upper town. The fierce battle between the encircled Janissaries and Szilágyi's soldiers inside the upper town was turning in favour of the Christians, and the Hungarians managed to beat off the fierce assault from outside the walls. The Janissaries remaining inside the city were thus massacred while the Ottoman troops trying to breach the upper town suffered heavy losses.

Battle

The next day something unexpected happened. By some accounts, the peasant crusaders started a spontaneous action, and forced Capistrano and Hunyadi to make use of the situation. Despite Hunyadi's orders to the defenders not to try to loot the Ottoman positions, some of the units crept out from demolished ramparts, took up positions across from the Ottoman line, and began harassing enemy soldiers. Ottoman Sipahis tried without success to disperse the harassing force. At once, more defenders joined those outside the wall. What began as an isolated incident quickly escalated into a full-scale battle.

John of Capistrano at first tried to order his men back inside the walls, but soon found himself surrounded by about 2,000 peasant levymen. He then began leading them toward the Ottoman lines, crying, "The Lord who made the beginning will take care of the finish!" Capistrano led his crusaders to the Ottoman rear across the Sava river. At the same time, Hunyadi started a desperate charge out of the fort to take the cannon positions in the Ottoman encampment.

Taken by surprise at this strange turn of events and, as some chroniclers say, seemingly paralyzed by some inexplicable fear, the Ottomans took flight. The Sultan's bodyguard of about 5,000 Janissaries tried desperately to stop the panic and recapture the camp, but by that time Hunyadi's army had also joined the unplanned battle, and the Ottoman efforts became hopeless. The Sultan himself advanced into the fight and killed a knight in single combat, but then took an arrow in the thigh and was rendered unconscious. After the battle, the Hungarian raiders were ordered to spend the night behind the walls of the fortress and to be on the alert for a possible renewal of the battle, but the Ottoman counterattack never came.

Under cover of darkness the Ottomans retreated in haste, bearing their wounded in 140 wagons. They withdrew to Constantinople.

Aftermath
However, the Hungarians paid dearly for this victory. Plague broke out in the camp, from which John Hunyadi himself died three weeks later (August 11, 1456). He was buried in the Cathedral of Gyulafehérvár (now Alba Iulia), the capital of Transylvania.

As the design of the fortress had proved its merits during the siege, some additional reinforcements were made by the Hungarians. The weaker eastern walls, where the Ottomans broke through into the upper town were reinforced by the Zindan Gate and the heavy Nebojša Tower. This was the last of the great modifications to the fortress until 1521, when Mehmed's great-grandson Suleiman eventually captured it.

Noon Bell
Pope Callixtus III ordered the bells of every European church to be rung every day at noon, as a call for believers to pray for the defenders of the city. The practice of the noon bell is traditionally attributed to the international commemoration of the victory at Belgrade and to the order of Pope Callixtus III, since in many countries (like England and the Spanish Kingdoms) news of the victory arrived before the order, and the ringing of the church bells at noon was thus transformed into a commemoration of the victory. The Pope didn't withdraw the order, and Catholic and the older Protestant churches still ring the noon bell to this day.

This custom still exists also among Protestant and Orthodox congregations. In the history of the University of Oxford, the victory was welcomed with the ringing of bells and great celebrations in England. Hunyadi sent a special courier, Erasmus Fullar, among others to Oxford with the news of the victory.

Legacy

The victory stopped the Ottoman advance towards Europe for 70 years, though they made other incursions such as the taking of Otranto between 1480 and 1481; and the raid of Croatia and Styria in 1493.  Belgrade would continue to protect Hungary from Ottoman attacks until the fort fell to the Ottomans in 1521.

After the siege of Belgrade stopped the advance of Mehmed II towards Central Europe; Serbia and Bosnia were absorbed into the Empire. Wallachia, the Crimean Khanate, and eventually Moldavia were merely converted into vassal states due to the strong military resistance to Mehmed's attempts of conquest. There were several reasons of why the Sultan did not directly attack Hungary and why he gave up the idea of advancing in that direction after his unsuccessful siege of Belgrade. The mishap at Belgrade indicated that the Empire could not expand further until Serbia and Bosnia were transformed into a secure base of operations. Furthermore, the significant political and military power of Hungary under Matthias Corvinus in the region surely influenced this hesitation too. Moreover, Mehmed was also distracted in his attempts to suppress insubordination from his Moldovan and Wallachian vassals.

With Hunyadi's victory at Belgrade, both Vlad III the Impaler and Stephen III of Moldavia came to power in their own domains, and Hunyadi himself went to great lengths to have his son Matthias placed on the Hungarian throne.

While fierce resistance and Hunyadi's effective leadership ensured that the daring and ambitious Sultan Mehmed would only get as far into Europe as the Balkans, the Sultan had already managed to transform the Ottoman Empire into what would become one of the most feared powers in Europe (as well as in Asia) for centuries.  Most of Hungary was eventually conquered in 1526 at the Battle of Mohács. Ottoman Muslim expansion into Europe continued with menacing success until the siege of Vienna in 1529, although Ottoman power in Europe remained strong and still threatening to Central Europe at times until the Battle of Vienna in 1683.

Literature and art
It is claimed that, after the defeat and while he and his army were retreating into Bulgaria, this sound defeat as well as the ensuing loss of no less than 24,000 of his best soldiers, angered Mehmed in such a manner that, in an uncontrollable fit of fury, he wounded a number of his generals with his own sword, just prior to their executions. The Sultan later came into conflict with Stephen III of Moldavia, resulting in an even worse defeat at Battle of Vaslui and later a pyrrhic victory at the Battle of Valea Albă.

An English poet and playwright Hannah Brand wrote five-act tragedy about the battle and siege of Belgrade, which was first performed in 1791. A fictional account from the viewpoint of a Christian mercenary is Christian Cameron, Tom Swan and the Siege of Belgrade from 2014 to 2015.

References

Bibliography

 
 
 
 
 
 
 
 

1456 in Europe
Military history of Belgrade
15th century in Serbia
15th century in Hungary
Belgrade
Belgrade 1456
Belgrade (1456)
Belgrade
Belgrade
Belgrade
Belgrade
15th century in Belgrade
1456 in the Ottoman Empire